Eileen Favorite (born September 10, 1964, in Chicago) is an American writer and teacher and living in Chicago, Illinois.  She received a B.A. in English with a French concentration from the University of Illinois, Urbana.  In 1999, she received an MFA in writing from the School of the Art Institute of Chicago.

Novel
Favorite's first novel, The Heroines, was published in 2007 by Scribner.  It has been translated into Italian, Korean, Russian (in press), and Finnish. The Rocky Mountain News called The Heroines one of the best debut novels of 2008, and the audio version was nominated for best audio recording of 2008 by Booklist.

Other works
Her poems and essays have also appeared in Poetry East, The Chicago Reader, Rhino, Midnight Mind and have aired on Chicago Public Radio (WBEZ).  She's received Illinois Arts Council Fellowships in both poetry and prose.

References

American women writers
Living people
1964 births
21st-century American women